Lemyra rubidorsa is a moth of the family Erebidae. It was described by Frederic Moore in 1865. It is found in Pakistan (Kashmir), India (Himachal-Pradesh, Sikkim, Assam) and China (Yunan, Tibet).

References

 

rubidorsa
Moths described in 1865